HMS Persian was a sixteen-gun  built for the Royal Navy during the 1830s.

Description
The ship's tonnage was 483  tons burthen. The Acorn class was initially armed with a pair of 32-pounder guns and fourteen 32-pounder carronades. The armament was later changed to four 32-pounder cannon and a dozen 32-pounder carronades. The ships had a crew of 110–30 officers and ratings.

Construction and career
Persian, the second ship of her name to serve in the Royal Navy, was ordered on 31 December 1835, laid down in May 1838 at Pembroke Dockyard, Wales, and launched on 7 October 1839. She was completed on 28 April 1840 at Plymouth Dockyard and commissioned on 23 February of that year.

Notes

References

1839 ships
Ships built in Pembroke Dock